Eric Morris Johnson II (born July 16, 1998) is an American football defensive tackle for the Indianapolis Colts of the National Football League (NFL). He played college football at Missouri State, and was drafted by the Indianapolis Colts in the fifth round of the 2022 NFL Draft.

Early life and high school
Johnson grew up in Plainfield, Illinois and attended Plainfield South High School.

College career
Johnson was a member of the Missouri State Bears for six seasons and redshirted his true freshman season. He decided to utilize the extra year of eligibility granted to college athletes who played in the 2020 season due to the COVID-19 pandemic and return to Missouri State for a sixth season. In his final season he was named second-team All-Missouri Valley Football Conference after recording 43 tackles, 6.5 tackles for loss, and 3 blocked kicks.

Professional career

Indianapolis Colts
Johnson was selected with the 159th overall pick by the Indianapolis Colts in the 2022 NFL Draft.

References

External links
 Indianapolis Colts bio
Missouri State Bears bio

Living people
American football defensive tackles
Players of American football from Illinois
Sportspeople from the Chicago metropolitan area
Missouri State Bears football players
People from Plainfield, Illinois
Indianapolis Colts players
1998 births